Sunitha Rao (born October 27, 1985) is an American former professional tennis player, who represented India in international tournaments. She won eight doubles titles on the ITF Circuit in her career. On July 7, 2008, she reached her best singles ranking of world No. 144. On May 19, 2008, she peaked at No. 108 in the doubles rankings.

Playing for India Fed Cup team, she has a win–loss record of 5–6. Rao also is the fourth female tennis player in history representing India to enter the top-200 world rankings, after Nirupama Sanjeev, Shikha Uberoi, and Sania Mirza.

Personal life
Rao was born in Jersey City, New Jersey in 1985 and was raised by her Indian immigrant parents Manohar and Savithri, who were from Chennai.

Career

2002–2007
Rao played her first WTA Tour match at the 2002 Brasil Open, where she defeated Vanessa Henke in the first round. She was beaten by Anastasia Myskina in the second round.

Rao played at the 2004 Korea Open where she was beaten by Miho Saeki in the first round. Rao participated at the 2005 Internationaux de Strasbourg, but was overpowered by Iveta Benešová in the first round. Then she played at the Sunfeast Open where she beat Neha Uberoi in the first round before falling to Elena Likhovtseva.

She took part at the 2006 Commonwealth Bank Tennis Classic, where she lost to Angelique Widjaja in the first round. She also suffered a first-round defeat at the 2006 Sunfeast Open to Nicole Pratt. Rao defeated Sandy Gumulya in the first round of the 2007 Sunfeast Open to advance to the second round where she lost to Anne Keothavong. She then lost in the first round of the 2007 Challenge Bell to Alina Jidkova.

2008
Rao received an entry into the PTT Pattaya Open via a lucky loser spot. She beat Junri Namigata before losing to Ekaterina Bychkova. Then, at the Copa Colsanitas, she lost to Edina Gallovits in the first round.

Rao received the best result of her WTA career at the 2008 DFS Classic in Birmingham. She beat Petra Kvitová (who would be the future world No. 2 and Wimbledon titlist) in the first round and Naomi Cavaday in the second before falling to Alona Bondarenko in the third round.

She partnered with Sania Mirza, representing India in the women's doubles event at the 2008 Summer Olympics in Beijing. They got a walkover in round one, but lost to Svetlana Kuznetsova and Dinara Safina of Russia in round two.

Rao announced retirement from tennis in 2009.

ITF finals

Singles (0–7)

Doubles (8–7)

References

External links
 

1985 births
Living people
People from Jersey City, New Jersey
Sportspeople from Bradenton, Florida
Tennis people from Florida
Tennis people from New Jersey
American female tennis players
Indian female tennis players
Tennis players at the 2008 Summer Olympics
Olympic tennis players of India
Indian-American tennis players
American sportspeople of Indian descent
American people of Indian Tamil descent
American expatriates in India
Babson College alumni
21st-century American women